The paqin (琶琴) is a modern bowed lute originating in China. The instrument has a pear-shaped wooden body like pipa, with neck no frets but bowed by horsehair bow.
 It has a bass variant, the dapaqin and a alto variant is the xiaopaqin (小琶琴). This is a combination of Chinese pipa with western cello and violin.

See also 
 Dapaqin
 Chinese music
 List of Chinese musical instruments

References

Chinese musical instruments